Jonathan Lerman (born 1987) is an American autistic savant outsider artist. He was born in Queens, NY, and currently resides in the upstate New York suburb of Vestal.

He began to lapse into long silences at the age of two, and the next year he was diagnosed with autism. His IQ is purported to be 53. His artistic bent appeared at the age of 10 years in the form of charcoal-drawn faces—both people he knows and those he imagines. In 1999, he had his own solo exhibition at the KS Art gallery in New York City.

He has had personal exhibitions, and has also exhibited his work alongside others. He was also the subject of the MTV television program True Life in the episode "True Life: I Have Autism" to describe his life as an autistic savant.

Books
George Braziller. Jonathan Lerman: The Drawings of a Boy with Autism (2002)

Notes and references

Notes

External links
Exhibit at KS Art
erstwhile "www.jonathanlerman.com" site
(see expiration notice for a possible explanation of why that erstwhile site is now history)
Portraits of Emotion: The Story of an Autistic Savant  Documentary about Jonathan Lerman

1987 births
20th-century American painters
21st-century American painters
21st-century American male artists
American male painters
Painters from New York City
Living people
Outsider artists
People from Queens, New York
People from Vestal, New York
Autistic savants
Artists with autism
20th-century American male artists